St. Joseph's Convent Higher Secondary School is an Indian school, located in Sambalpur, Odisha.

History 
It was founded in 1963 at Sakhipada in Sambalpur by the Sisters of Saint Joseph's, Chambéry, India along with the late Mr Banmali Babu, a social activist in Western Odisha. The pioneer of the school was Sr. Mary Ann. The school celebrated its golden jubilee on 11 December 2012.

Campus 
The school has a campus of 25 acres.  It accommodates five separate blocks – kindergarten, primary school, middle school, junior high school and senior secondary school – along with the administrative and staff block.

Facilities 
Three science laboratories for physics, chemistry and biology.
Two advanced computer laboratories; CS LAB 1 for the middle high school and CS LAB 2 for the senior secondary school.
An in-door hall.
An assembly ground with a stage.
A central library.
A Basketball court.

The school provides adequate facilities for sports ad co-curricular activities. In April 2014, the school installed Smart Class room boards to enhance teaching methods with advanced audio-visual aid. CCTV cameras are also installed to ensure security of students.

Curriculum 
The school follows the Indian Certificate of Secondary Education (ICSE) and the Indian School Certificate (ISC) pattern of examinations, following the guidelines laid down by the Council for the Indian School Certificate Examinations.

The school follows the pattern of Continuous and Comprehensive Evaluation scheme laid down by National Council of Educational Research and Training in the junior and middle schools. Home assignments, note-book assessments, projects, aura-oral tests, school attendance and personal qualities are also summed up to evaluate a pupil's result for a particular academic year.

The school follows the package system. There are six days in each package. Each package has eights classes/periods of 35 minutes, each. A package has two leisure, sports and activities classes; two value education classes; one Socially Useful Productive Work and drawing class; one art education class; and one physical education class, along with individual classes for curricular subjects offered in a particular academic year, for every class.

Extracurricular activities 
The school has a provision for Socially Useful Productive Work class where students are suggested to use their creativity in making arts and crafts. The school conducts the House Assembly on every Wednesday and mimes Club Assembly on every Thursday.

It has divided its students into four groups/houses – Radhakrishnan House (Green House), Tagore House (Brown House), Aurobindo House (Blue House) and Gandhi House (Red House).

The School Annual Cultural Bonanza, Annual Athletic Meet, School Fete and Science Exhibitions are conducted alternatively, once in three years. Different school clubs like The Eco-club, Interaction Club (by Rotary Club) enable in students a sense of creativity, moral and social responsibility. Apart from that, various inter-house dance competitions, skit competitions, elocution, literary writing and debate competitions, patriotic singing competitions, general knowledge tests and house assembly prayer services on special observation days are conducted to build up leadership qualities in a student.

School parliamentary system 
The school has its own parliamentary system for its smooth functioning. Students from class 12 are nominated by committee of senior teachers headed by the principal for assigning them certain portfolios of the school parliament, including prime minister, head boy/girl, discipline minister, education minister, sports and traffic minister. Selected student from class 11 are given deputy charge of the above portfolios. The house boy and girl captains (amongst Class 10 students) and house boy and girl vice captains (amongst class 9 students) are elected by the Students of classes 8, 9 and 10 (high school students). An investiture ceremony is held (usually in July) in which they take their oath to serve the school.

Cabinet meetings also take place, headed by the principal and attended by all the cabinet members, house captains and vice captains, high school teachers and sometimes class monitors of all classes. The meeting is held twice or thrice in a year and is held in the Hall.

See also 

 Education in Odisha
 List of schools in Odisha

References

External links 
 

Sisters of Saint Joseph schools
Catholic secondary schools in India
Co-educational schools in India
Primary schools in India
High schools and secondary schools in Odisha
Christian schools in Odisha
Private schools in Odisha
Education in Sambalpur district
Educational institutions established in 1963
1963 establishments in Orissa